The Helicam is a remote-controlled mini helicopter used to obtain aerial pictures or motion images using video, still or motion film cameras. The remote controlled camera mount system allows pan, tilt and roll movements. A wireless onboard video transmitter downlinks the live signal to the camera operator, images can be recorded on board, on the ground or both. The system is controlled by two operators with independent controls: the helicam pilot and camera operator.

One of the characteristics of the helicam is the flexibility and small size. The system can be flown practically everywhere providing a small spot of about 4 square meters is available to take off and land. Flight endurance ranges from 15 to 30 minutes, refueling can be done in seconds.

The latest generation Helicam uses turbine engines to improve endurance and usability. Newer versions feature electric propulsion, using lithium polymer batteries. The benefit of electric propulsion is reduced vibration and environmental impact. Whilst conventionally the Helicam has been a two-blade system, the latest developments include six-rotor and eight-rotor systems to enable the use of larger and heavier camera systems. 

The field of use of these systems range from advertising, survey, exploration, SAR, military, cinematography, etc. The advent of miniaturized GPS guided auto-piloting systems will expand the use of these systems to a new level.

References

Radio-controlled helicopters
Reconnaissance aircraft
Aerial cameras